Army Group C (in German, Heeresgruppe C or HGr C) was an army group of the German Wehrmacht, that was formed twice during the Second World War.

History
Army Group C was formed from Army Group 2 in Frankfurt on 26 August 1939. It initially commanded all troops on Germany's western front but after the Polish campaign it was reduced to commanding the southern half of the western front, overseeing the frontal breakthrough through the Maginot Line during June 1940. At the end of the battle of France it moved back to Germany then – under the cover name "Section Staff East Prussia" – moved to East Prussia on 20 April 1941. On 21 June 1941 it was renamed Army Group North.

It was re-formed on 26 November 1943, by being separated from the staff of Supreme Commander South (OB Süd Luftwaffe) and put in command of the southwestern front and the Italian Campaign. As such, the commander of Heeresgruppe C served also as the Oberbefehlshaber (OB) Südwest.

On 2 May 1945 Army Group C surrendered.

Commanders
1st time

2nd time

Composition

 Army Group C Order of Battle from August, 1944.

Sources 
 Lexikon de Wehrmacht Heeresgruppe C
 Axis History Heeresgruppe C

C
Military units and formations established in 1939
Military units and formations disestablished in 1945